Nankaung is a village in Homalin Township, Hkamti District, in the Sagaing Region of northwestern Burma. It lies on the Chindwin River to the north of Tason.

References

External links
Maplandia World Gazetteer

Populated places in Hkamti District
Homalin Township